Solar power in Ohio has been increasing, as the cost of photovoltaics has decreased. Ohio installed 10 MW of solar in 2015. Ohio adopted a net metering rule which allows any customer generating up to 25 kW to use net metering, with the kilowatt hour surplus rolled over each month, and paid by the utility once a year at the generation rate upon request. For hospitals there is no limit on size, but two meters are required, one for generation, the other for utility supplied power.

In 2010, the 12 MW solar farm in Upper Sandusky was the largest solar farm in the state. It was later surpassed by the 20MW DG AMP Solar Bowling Green farm, which was completed in January 2017.

The First Solar factory in Perrysburg can produce almost 600 MW of panels per year.

Costs have decreased to the point that the average consumer may save approximately $17,527 over a 20-year period by installing solar panels. Euclid's City Hall and library installed solar panels and expects to save $25,000 over the next 15 years. The panels were installed at no cost to the city by Ohio Cooperative Solar, which is leasing the rooftops.

Solar projects
Overall capacity of Ohio's utility-scale solar projects was estimated at 100 MW in December 2020, with an additional 400 MW projected to come online within a year.

Toledo area
In 2009, ground broke on what was then one of the largest solar fields in the United States, located in Wyandot County, near Upper Sandusky. The 12-MW plant, finished in September 2010, was constructed by Germany-based Juwi Solar and is called Wyandot Solar LLC., leasing its energy to AEP.

A 1.1 MW solar field was constructed by Advanced Distributed Generation on the University of Toledo campus.

The airbase for 180th Fighter Wing of the Ohio Air National Guard in Toledo has a 1.2 MW solar installation.

In 2010, the Ohio Department of Transportation announced Xunlight and First Solar would provide 100 kW of panels for a $1.5 million research project at the Veterans' Glass City Skyway in Toledo.

Dayton
In 2009, University of Dayton graduate Zachary Layman's company Solar Roadways received a $100,000 grant from the U.S. Department of Energy to develop his solar road prototype, which embeds solar panels into driving surfaces. It won General Electric's Ecomagination Challenge Award in 2010.

Another of the state's largest solar arrays was constructed by The Dayton Power and Light Company in Dayton. The solar field generates 1.1 Megawatts of power.

Elsewhere
In September 2009, Third Sun Solar in collaboration with the Akron Metro Regional Transit Authority and Sharp Solar Energy Solutions Group installed the largest rooftop solar array in the state, comprising 2,076 solar modules producing 488 kW.

Cincinnati Zoo and Melink Corporation announced the opening of a new 1.56 MW solar canopy in 2011. The 6,400 solar panels, located in the Zoo's Vine Street Parking Lot, provide 20% of the Zoo's power needs.

In 2012, Campbell Soup Company built a 9.8 MW solar plant constructed to provide energy for its operations in Napoleon.

Renewable portfolio standard
HB6, which passed the state legislature in July 2019, phases out Ohio's renewable portfolio standard completely. A referendum petition has been started to overturn HB6. Ohio had a renewable portfolio standard which calls for 0.06% from solar by 2012, 0.09% by 2013, and 0.5% from solar and 12.5% from renewable sources by 2026. However, the standard was frozen in government in 2014 and no further increases were required. Ohio used 154,145 million kWh in 2010. Approximately 75 MW is required to generate 0.5% of the state's demand. Covering rooftops with solar panels in Ohio (46,800 MW) would generate 35.3% of demand. Many of the homes, schools and businesses which have installed solar panels can be monitored online.

Statistics

See also

Wind power in Ohio
Solar power in the United States
Renewable energy in the United States

References

External links

Incentives and Policies

Energy in Ohio
Ohio